The 2012 CAF Confederation Cup Final was the final of 2012 CAF Confederation Cup, the 9th edition of the CAF Confederation Cup, Africa's secondary club football competition organized by the Confederation of African Football (CAF).

The final was played between Djoliba from Mali and AC Léopards from the Republic of the Congo. AC Léopards won 4–3 on aggregate (first leg: 2–2; second leg: 2–1) to win their first title. As the winner of the 2012 CAF Confederation Cup, they qualified to participate in the 2013 CAF Super Cup against the winner of the 2012 CAF Champions League.

Road to final

Notes
† Djoliba advanced to the second round after being awarded the tie by CAF, as URA did not travel to Mali for the second leg due to the Malian crisis.

Rules
The final was decided over two legs, with aggregate goals used to determine the winner. If the sides were level on aggregate after the second leg, the away goals rule would have been applied, and if still level, the tie would have proceeded directly to a penalty shootout (no extra time is played).

First leg

Second leg

References

External links
CAF Confederation Cup

Final
2012
November 2012 sports events in Africa
AC Léopards matches
Djoliba AC matches